We Are Family is the third studio album by the American R&B vocal group Sister Sledge, released on January 22, 1979, in the United States and on April 30, 1979, in the United Kingdom by Cotillion Records. The album was written and produced by Nile Rodgers and Bernard Edwards of the band Chic, and includes four hit singles: the title track, "He's the Greatest Dancer", "Lost in Music" and "Thinking of You", all of which have been sampled, remixed, and reissued in the decades after the album's release. The album reached number one on the Top R&B Albums chart and peaked at number three on the Billboard 200, making it the band's most commercially successful album.

Background
Chic worked with Sister Sledge, who had signed to Atlantic in 1973, at the inspiration of Atlantic president Jerry L. Greenberg. Nile Rodgers remembered later; " That's why we came up with We Are Family. [–] Everything he said about them gave us a picture of them. You've got to remember, we never even met them. [-] All of the content on that record came from that one day with the president [–] I was fascinated and enthralled by the concept of people who loved music who could be in the midst of the whole disco era."

We Are Family is one of two albums produced by Bernard Edwards and Nile Rodgers in 1979, the other being Chic's third album Risqué including hit singles "Good Times" and "My Forbidden Lover". Nile Rodgers has written that of the various albums produced by The Chic Organization for themselves and others, "pound for pound, I think We Are Family is our best album hands down."

The lead vocals to "We Are Family" were recorded in a single take by the then 19-year-old Kathy Sledge. "He's the Greatest Dancer" was the first single from the album and became the group's first major hit, reaching the top 10 on the Billboard Hot 100 and number one on the R&B chart. We Are Family was digitally remastered and reissued on CD by Rhino Records in 1995.

Track listing

All songs written by Bernard Edwards and Nile Rodgers.

 "He's the Greatest Dancer" – 6:16 
 "Lost in Music" – 4:52 
 "Somebody Loves Me" – 4:59
 "Thinking of You" – 4:31
 "We Are Family" – 8:24 
 "Easier to Love" – 5:05
 "You're a Friend to Me" – 5:31
 "One More Time" – 3:17

Re–mastered CD bonus tracks
The re–mastered CD was released in 1995. 
 "We Are Family" (Sure Is Pure Remix) – 8:05 
 "We Are Family" (Steve Anderson DMC Remix) – 8:13 
 "Lost in Music" (Sure Is Pure Remix) – 8:38 
 "Lost in Music" (1984 Bernard Edwards and Nile Rodgers Remix) – 6:37

Personnel

Sister Sledge
 Kathy Sledge – lead vocals (tracks: 1, 3, 4, 5)
 Debbie Sledge – lead vocals (on "You're a Friend to Me")
 Joni Sledge – lead vocals (on "Lost in Music" and "Easier to Love")
 Kim Sledge – lead vocals (on "One More Time")
with:
 Nile Rodgers – guitar
 Bernard Edwards – bass
 Tony Thompson – drums
 Robert Sabino – piano, Hohner clavinet
 Raymond Jones – keyboards, Fender Rhodes electric piano
 Andy Schwartz – piano
 Sammy Figueroa – percussion
 Jon Faddis – trumpet
 Ellen Seeling – trumpet
 Barry Rogers – trombone
 Jean Fineberg – saxophone
 Alex Foster – saxophone, flute
 Gene Orloff – concertmaster
 Cheryl Hong – strings
 Marianne Carroll – strings
 Karen Milne – strings
 Luther Vandross – backing vocals
 Norma Jean Wright – backing vocals
 David Lasley – backing vocals
 Alfa Anderson – backing vocals
 Diva Gray  – backing vocals
 Simon LeBon – additional vocals on "Lost in Music" (1984 mix)
 Andy Taylor – additional vocals on "Lost in Music" (1984 mix)
Technical
 Bob Defrin – art direction
 Jim Houghton – photography

Charts

Weekly charts

Year-end charts

See also
 List of number-one R&B albums of 1979 (U.S.)
 List of number-one dance singles of 1979 (U.S.)
 List of number-one R&B singles of 1979 (U.S.)

References

External links
 
 Sister Sledge - We Are Family (1979) album to be listened as stream on Spotify

1979 albums
Cotillion Records albums
Albums produced by Nile Rodgers
Albums produced by Bernard Edwards
Sister Sledge albums